Frode Sørensen may refer to:

 Frode Sørensen (politician) (born 1946), Danish politician
 Frode Sørensen (cyclist) (1912–1980), Danish cyclist